James W. Dollins was an English professional association footballer who played as an inside forward.

Dollins began his career with Burnley in 1909; however, after just eight league appearances he signed for the Clarets Lancashire rivals Blackpool.

He made his debut for the Seasiders, who were yet to appoint their first full-time manager, on 4 November 1911, in a goalless draw at Gainsborough Trinity. He went on to appear in a further four games during the 1911–12 league campaign.

Dollins made thirteen starts in 1912–13 and scored his only professional goal. It came in the penultimate league game of the season: a 2–1 victory over Huddersfield Town at Bloomfield Road on 19 April. He made his final appearance for the club in the next game, a 2–1 defeat at arch-rivals Preston North End.

References

People from Fleetwood
English footballers
Association football forwards
Burnley F.C. players
Blackpool F.C. players
English Football League players
Year of birth missing
Year of death missing
Place of death missing